Joyride is a Philippine television drama series broadcast by GMA Network. It stars Cogie Domingo, JC de Vera, Mark Herras, Jennylyn Mercado, Yasmien Kurdi, Sheena Halili and Rainier Castillo. It premiered on August 16, 2004 on the network's Dramarama sa Hapon line up replacing Stage 1: The StarStruck Playhouse. The series concluded on March 11, 2005 with a total of 150 episodes.

Cast and characters

Lead cast
 JC de Vera as Carlo
 Cogie Domingo as Jason
 Jennylyn Mercado as Casey
 Mark Herras as Joeyboy
 Yasmien Kurdi as Rene / Irene
 Rainier Castillo as Ken

Supporting cast
 Katrina Halili as Vicki
 Sheena Halili as Andrea
 Dion Ignacio as D.J./Brix
 Julianne Lee as Nicole
 Warren Austria as Justin

References

External links
 

2004 Philippine television series debuts
2005 Philippine television series endings
Filipino-language television shows
GMA Network drama series
Philippine teen drama television series
Television series about teenagers
Television shows set in the Philippines